Gorakhnath (also known as Goraksanath, c. early 11th century) was a Hindu yogi, saint who was the influential founder of the Nath Hindu monastic movement in India He is considered one of the two notable disciples of Matsyendranath. His followers, found all over India, are called yogis, Gorakhnathi, Darshani or Kanphata.

He was one of nine saints also known as Navnath and is widely popular in Maharashtra, India. Hagiographies describe him as more than a human teacher and someone outside the laws of time who appeared on earth in different ages. Historians state Gorakhnath lived sometime during the first half of the 2nd millennium CE, but they disagree in which century. Estimates based on archaeology and text range from Briggs' 15th to 12th century to Grierson's estimate of the 14th century.

Gorakhnath is considered a Maha-yogi (or great yogi) in the Hindu tradition. He did not emphasise a specific metaphysical theory or a particular Truth, but emphasised that the search for Truth and the spiritual life is a valuable and normal goal of man. Gorakhnath championed Yoga, spiritual discipline and an ethical life of self-determination as a means to reaching samadhi and one's own spiritual truths.

Gorakhnath, his ideas and yogis have been highly popular in rural India, with monasteries and temples dedicated to him found in many states of India, particularly in the eponymous city of Gorakhpur.

Biography

Historian accounts

Historians vary in their estimate on when Gorakhnath lived. Estimates based on archaeology and text range from Briggs' 11th to 12th century to Baba Farid documents and Jnanesvari manuscripts leading Abbott to connect Gorakhnath to the 13th century, to Grierson, who, relying on evidence discovered in Gujarat, suggests the 14th century. His influence is found in the numerous references to him in the poetry of Kabir and of Guru Nanak of Sikhism, which describe him as a very powerful leader with a large following, thereby suggesting he likely lived around the time these spiritual leaders lived in India.

Historical texts imply that Gorakhnath was originally a Buddhist in a region influenced by Shaivism, and he converted to Hinduism championing Shiva and Yoga. Gorakhnath led a life as a passionate exponent of ideas of Kumarila and Adi Shankara that championed the Yogic and Advaita Vedanta interpretation of the Upanishads. Gorakhnath considered the controversy between dualism and nondualism spiritual theories in medieval India as useless from practice point of view, he emphasised that the choice is of the yogi, that the spiritual discipline and practice by either path leads to "perfectly illumined samadhi state of the individual phenomenal consciousness", states Banerjea.

Hagiographic accounts
The hagiography on Gorakhnath describe him to have appeared on earth several times. The legends do not provide a time or place where he was born, and consider him to be superhuman. North Indian hagiographies suggest he originated from northwest India (Punjab, with some mentioning Peshawar). Other hagiographies on Gorakhnath in Bengal and Bihar suggest he originated from eastern region of India (Assam).

These hagiographies are inconsistent, and offer varying records of the spiritual descent of Gorakhnath. All name Adinath and Matsyendranath as two teachers preceding him in the succession. Though one account lists five gurus preceding Adinath and another lists six teachers between Matsyendranath and Gorakhnath, current tradition has Adinath identified with Lord Shiva as the direct teacher of  Matsyendranath, who was himself the direct teacher of Gorakhnath.

The legends in the Nath tradition assert that he travelled widely across the Indian subcontinent, and accounts about him are found in some form in most regions of the Indian subcontinent  including Nepal, Tibet, Punjab, Sindh, Kashmir, Khyber Pakhtunkhwa, Kabul, Uttar Pradesh, Uttarakhand, Assam, Sikkim, Tripura, Bengal, Bihar, Odisha, Kathiawar(Gujarat), Kutch, Maharashtra, Karnataka, Tamil Nadu and even Sri Lanka.

Nath Sampradaya
The Nath tradition states that its traditions existed before Gorakhnath, but the movement's greatest expansion happened under the guidance and inspiration of Gorakhnath. He produced a number of writings and even today is considered the greatest of the Naths. It has been purported that Gorakhnath wrote the first books on Laya yoga. In India there are many caves, many with temples built over them, where it is said that Gorakhnath spent time in meditation. According to Bhagawan Nityananda, the samadhi shrine (tomb) of Gorakhnath is at Nath Mandir near the Vajreshwari temple about one kilometre from Ganeshpuri, Maharashtra, India. According to legends Gorakhnath and Matsyendranath did penance in Kadri Temple at Mangalore, Karnataka. They are also instrumental in laying Shivlingam at Kadri and Dharmasthala.

The temple of Gorakhnath is also situated on hill called Garbhagiri near Vambori, Tal Rahuri; Dist Ahmednagar. There is also a famous temple of Gorakhnath in the state of Odisha.

Gorakhnath Math

The Gorakhnath Math is a monastery of the Nath monastic group named after the medieval saint, Gorakhnath (c. 11th century), of the Nath sampradaya. The math and town of Gorakhpur in Uttar Pradesh is named after him. The monastery and the temple perform various cultural and social activities and serve as the cultural hub of the city. The monastery also publishes texts on the philosophy of Gorakhnath.

Influence

Hatha yoga
Some scholars associate the origins of Hatha yoga with the Nath yogis, in particular Gorakhnath and his guru Matsyendranath. According to British indologist James Mallinson, this association is false. In his view, the origins of hatha yoga should be associated with the Dashanami Sampradaya of Advaita Vedanta (Hinduism), the mystical figure of Dattatreya, and the Rāmānandīs.

While the origins of Hatha yoga are disputed, according to Guy Beck, a professor of Religious Studies known for his studies on Yoga and music, "the connections between Goraknath, the Kanphatas and Hatha yoga are beyond question".

Langars (community kitchens)
According to Arvind-Pal Singh Mandair, a professor in Asian languages and cultures, the Gorakhnath orders were operating free community kitchens in Punjab before Guru Nanak founded Sikhism. Gorakhnath shrines have continued to operate a langar and provide a free meal to pilgrims who visit.

Nepal

The Gurkhas of Nepal take their name from this saint. Gorkha, a historical district of Nepal, is named after him.

There is a cave with his paduka (footprints) and an idol of him. Every year on the day of Baisakh Purnima there is a great celebration in Gorkha at his cave, called Rot Mahotsav; it has been celebrated for the last seven hundred years.

A legend asserts, state William Northey and John Morris, that a disciple of Machendra by name Gorakhnath, once visited Nepal and retired to a little hill near Deo Patan. There he meditated in an unmovable state for twelve years. The locals built a temple in his honour there, and it has since been remembered with.

In Tamil Siddhar tradition
Korakkar is one among the 18 Siddhars and also known as Goraknath amongst Navanathar. Agattiyar and Bogar were his gurus. His Jeeva samadhi temple is in Vadukupoigainallur of Nagapattinam district of Tamil Nadu. According to one account, he spent a portion of his growing-up years in the Velliangiri Mountains in Coimbatore.

Other sanctums related with Korakkar are Perur, Thiruchendur and Triconamalli. Korakkar caves are found in Chaturagiri and Kolli Hills. Like other siddhas, Korakkar has written songs on Medicine, Philosophy, and Alchemy.

West Bengal – Assam – Tripura
The Bengali Community located in these states and neighbouring country of Bangladesh have a sizeable number of Yogi Brahmins (also called Rudraja Brahmins/ Yogi Nath) who have taken their name from this saint.

Works

Romola Butalia, an Indian writer of Yoga history, lists the works attributed to Gorakhnath as including the Gorakṣaśataka, Goraksha Samhita, Goraksha Gita, Siddha Siddhanta Paddhati, Yoga Martanda, Yoga Siddhanta Paddhati, Yogabīja, Yogacintamani.

Siddha Siddhanta Paddhati

The Siddha Siddhanta Paddhati is a Hatha Yoga Sanskrit text attributed to Gorakhnath by the Nath tradition. According to Feuerstein (1991: p. 105), it is "one of the earliest hatha yoga scriptures, the Siddha Siddhanta Paddhati, contains many verses that describe the avadhuta" (liberated) yogi.

The Siddha Siddhanta Paddhati text is based on an advaita (nonduality) framework, where the yogi sees "himself in all beings, and all in himself" including the identity of the individual soul (Atman) with the universal (Brahman). This idea appears in the text in various forms, such as the following:

See also
Gorakh Aya
Maya Machhindra
Gorakhnath Temple
Yogi Nath
Gorakh Hill
Korakkar
Ratan Nath Temple
Tilla Jogian
List of Hindu gurus and saints

References

Sources

 
  (2009 Reprint)

Further reading 
Adityanath (2005). Gorakhnath. Retrieved 7 March 2006.
 Romola Butalia (2003). In the Presence of the Masters. Delhi, India: Motilal Banarsidass. 
Dhallapiccola, Anna. Dictionary of Hindu Lore and Legend. 
 Gordan Djurdjevic & Shukdev Singh, Sayings of Gorakhnāth: Annotated Translation of the Gorakh Bānī, Oxford University Press, 2019.
Mahendranath, Shri Gurudev. Notes on Pagan India. Retrieved 7 March 2006.

External links

  
 Bibliography of Goraksanatha's works, Item 666, Karl Potter, University of Washington

11th-century births
Ascetics
Indian Shaivite religious leaders
Mahasiddhas
Indian Hindu yogis
Inchegeri Sampradaya
Hindu philosophers and theologians
Spiritual practice
Spiritual teachers
Tantra
Medieval Hindu religious leaders
Year of death unknown
Place of death unknown
Place of birth unknown
Navnath